The Carolina Classic Fair, formerly the Dixie Classic Fair, is an annual fair held in Winston-Salem, North Carolina. The fair takes place every autumn on the Winston-Salem Fairgrounds (formerly the Forsyth County Fairgrounds), which is part of the Winston-Salem Entertainment-Sports Complex; the grounds are next to the Lawrence Joel Veterans Memorial Coliseum. In 2007, 371,219 people attended, setting a record that ranked the fair as the 50th-best-attended in North America. In the state, it has been second only to the North Carolina State Fair in attendance for many years.

The fair began in the former town of Salem as a grain exposition in 1882 (2007 was the 125th anniversary). In 1897, the Piedmont Tobacco Fair was started and shortly thereafter the two events merged to form the Winston-Salem Fair. The fair moved to its current fairgrounds in 1952 and changed its name to the "Dixie Classic Fair for Northwest North Carolina" in 1956. Before 2019, the event was most commonly known as just the Dixie Classic Fair.

In October 2019, the Winston-Salem City Council voted to change the name because "Dixie" was seen as lauding the slave-owning and secessionist Confederate States of America.

There were no fairs in 1917-18, 1942-45, or 2020.

External links
 Carolina Classic Fair official website

References

Annual fairs
Economy of Winston-Salem, North Carolina
Culture of Winston-Salem, North Carolina
Fairs in the United States
Tourist attractions in Winston-Salem, North Carolina